Beijing, literally "northern capital" in Chinese, is the capital city of the People's Republic of China.

Beijing may also refer to:

Historical capitals
 Taiyuan, formerly Běijīng or Běidū, capital city under the Tang Dynasty and Later Five Dynasties
 Daming County, formerly Beijing, capital under the Northern Song dynasty
 Ningcheng County, Inner Mongolia Autonomous Region, known as Beijing under the 12th-century Jurchen Jin dynasty

Places in People's Republic of China
Beijing Subdistrict, Guangzhou (北京街道), a subdistrict of Yuexiu District, Guangzhou, Guangdong
Beijing, Guangxi (北景), a town in Dahua Yao Autonomous County, Guangxi
Beijing Township (北景乡), a township in Linyi County, Shanxi

Other uses
Beijing (locomotive) or China Railways BJ, a diesel-hydraulic locomotive
Beijing 1, a 1950s aircraft prototype
 Common metonym for the Government of China

See also

 Historical capitals of China
 Peking (disambiguation)
 Pekin (disambiguation)
 Beijingese (disambiguation)